Dhanam may refer to:
 Dhanam (1991 film), a Malayalam film
 Dhanam (2008 film), a Tamil drama film
 Dhanam (business magazine), a fortnightly business magazine in Malayalam language